The 2000 Thomas & Uber Cup was the 21st tournament of the Thomas Cup, and the 18th tournament of the Uber Cup, which are the major international team competitions in world badminton.

Host city selection
Kuala Lumpur, Malaysia was the only city to submit a bid. International Badminton Federation accepted the bid during a meeting in Copenhagen.

Thomas Cup

Teams
49 teams took part in the competition, and eight teams qualified for the final Stage, including Indonesia, as defending champion, and Malaysia, as host team.

Final stage

Group A

Group B

Knockout stage

Semi-finals

Final

Uber Cup

Teams
43 teams took part in the competition, and eight teams qualified for the final Stage.

Final stage

Group A

Group B

Knockout stage

Semi-finals

Final

References

External links
Thomas, Uber Cup teams announced
Smash: 2000 Thomas Cup - Final Round
Smash: Uber Cup Calendar
Smash: 2000 Uber Cup - Final Round

Thomas & Uber Cup
Thomas Uber Cup
Badminton tournaments in Malaysia
International sports competitions hosted by Malaysia
Sport in Kuala Lumpur
Thomas Uber Cup